Nescopeck State Park is a Pennsylvania state park on  in Butler and Dennison Townships, Luzerne County, Pennsylvania (in the United States). The park is one of the newest state parks in Pennsylvania. In the early 1970s, the state acquired 164 properties which made up the park. The park's Environmental Education Center is one of its newest additions; it opened in April 2005. Nescopeck Creek runs through the valley between Mount Yeager and Nescopeck Mountain. The park is near Interstate 80 just off Pennsylvania Route 309 (near Conyngham).

Trails
The trails go through forests, meadows and wetlands. Most trails begin at Honey Hole Road which is the main access road for the park. The trails are open for cross-country skiing but closed to mountain biking.

Wildlife
 of wetlands, forests, and the banks of Nescopeck Creek are the habitat of:
 over 160 different species of birds
 30 species of reptiles and amphibians
 over 600 species of plants.

Hunting and fishing
Hunting is permitted on most of Nescopeck State Park.  Hunters are expected to follow the rules and regulations of the Pennsylvania Game Commission. The common game species are squirrels, turkey, woodcock, and white-tailed deer. Hunters may also access State Game Lands 187 through the park for additional hunting opportunities.

Lake Frances is a  man-made lake on a tributary of Nescopeck Creek. The lake has panfish, bass and trout in its waters. Nescopeck Creek is designated as a high quality cold-water fishery with brown and brook trout.

Gallery

Nearby state parks
The following state parks are within  of Nescopeck State Park:
Beltzville State Park (Carbon County)
Big Pocono State Park (Monroe County)
Frances Slocum State Park (Luzerne County)
Gouldsboro State Park (Monroe and Wayne Counties) 
Hickory Run State Park (Carbon County)
Lehigh Gorge State Park (Carbon and Luzerne Counties)
Locust Lake State Park (Schuylkill County)
Ricketts Glen State Park (Columbia, Luzerne, and Sullivan Counties)
Tobyhanna State Park (Monroe and Wayne Counties)
Tuscarora State Park (Schuylkill County)

References

External links

 

State parks of Pennsylvania
Protected areas established in 2005
Parks in Luzerne County, Pennsylvania
Nature centers in Pennsylvania
Protected areas of Luzerne County, Pennsylvania